Jesper Kristoffersen (born 2 February 1984) is a former Danish professional football defender.

Living people
1982 births
Danish men's footballers
Hvidovre IF players
SønderjyskE Fodbold players

Association football defenders
BK Avarta players